Liu Sheng may refer to:

 Liu Sheng, Prince of Zhongshan (劉勝; died 113 BC), Han dynasty king/prince
 Liu Sheng (Southern Han) (劉晟; 920–958), Emperor of Southern Han
 Liu Sheng (Ming dynasty) (柳升; died 1427), Ming dynasty general; see Lam Sơn uprising
 Liu Sheng (born 1956), Chinese politician
 Liu Sheng (footballer) (刘盛; born 1989)